Trichoxycentrus rugiceps is a species of beetle in the family Carabidae, the only species in the genus Trichoxycentrus.

References

Harpalinae